Huilong is a town of Dazu District in western Chongqing Municipality, People's Republic of China, located  northwest of downtown Chongqing. , it has one residential community (社区) and seven villages under its administration.

References

Township-level divisions of Chongqing
Towns in Chongqing